Richard Thomson may refer to:

 Richard Thomson (theologian) (died 1613), Dutch-born English theologian and translator
 Richard Thomson (antiquarian) (1794–1865), English librarian
 Richard Thomson (cricketer) (born 1938), English cricketer
 Richard M. Thomson (born 1933), Canadian banker
 Richard Thomson (politician), Scottish politician
 Richie Thomson (1940–2012), New Zealand Olympic cyclist
 Ricky Thomson (born 1957), Scottish footballer

See also
 Thomson (surname)
 Richard Thompson (disambiguation)